The 2017 NFL season was the 98th season in the history of the National Football League (NFL) and the 52nd of the Super Bowl era. The season began on September 7, 2017, with the Kansas City Chiefs defeating defending the Super Bowl LI champion New England Patriots in the NFL Kickoff Game. The season concluded with Super Bowl LII, in which the National Football Conference (NFC) champion Philadelphia Eagles defeated the American Football Conference (AFC) champion New England Patriots to win their first Super Bowl title, and fourth NFL championship, in franchise history.

For the second time since the league expanded to a 16-game season, a team finished winless in a full season, as Cleveland lost all 16 of their games this season.

For the second consecutive year, a team relocated to the Los Angeles metropolitan area, as the former San Diego Chargers announced their intent to do so in January 2017.

This is the most recent NFL season to not have any regular season games end in a tie.

Player movements and retirements
The 2017 NFL League year began on March 9 at 4:00 p.m. ET. On March 7, clubs were allowed to contact and enter into contract negotiations with the agents of players who became unrestricted free agents upon the expiration of their contracts two days later. On March 9, clubs exercised options for 2017 on players who have option clauses in their contracts, submitted qualifying offers to their restricted free agents with expiring contracts and to whom desire to retain a Right of Refusal/Compensation, submitted a Minimum Salary Tender to retain exclusive negotiating rights to their players with expiring 2016 contracts and who have fewer than three accrued seasons of free agent credit, and teams were required to be under the salary cap using the "Top-51" definition (in which the 51 highest paid-players on the team's payroll must have a collected salary cap hit below the actual cap). The 2017 trading period also began the same day.

Free agency
A total of 496 players were eligible for some form of free agency at the beginning of the free agency period. Notable players to change teams via free agency included:
Quarterbacks Jay Cutler (Chicago to Miami), Brock Osweiler (Houston to Cleveland) 
Running backs Jamaal Charles (Kansas City to Denver), Eddie Lacy (Green Bay to Seattle), Latavius Murray (Oakland to Minnesota), Adrian Peterson (Minnesota to New Orleans), and Mike Tolbert (Carolina to Buffalo)
Wide receivers Kenny Britt (Los Angeles Rams to Cleveland), Pierre Garçon (Washington to San Francisco), DeSean Jackson (Washington to Tampa Bay), Alshon Jeffery (Chicago to Philadelphia), Brandon Marshall (New York Jets to New York Giants), Terrelle Pryor (Cleveland to Washington), Torrey Smith (San Francisco to Philadelphia), and Robert Woods (Buffalo to Los Angeles Rams), 
Tight ends Martellus Bennett (New England to Green Bay) and Jared Cook (Green Bay to Oakland);
Offensive linemen Kelvin Beachum (Jacksonville to New York Jets), Matt Kalil (Minnesota to Carolina), T. J. Lang (Green Bay to Detroit), Ronald Leary (Dallas to Denver), Russell Okung (Denver to Los Angeles Chargers),  Riley Reiff (Detroit to Minnesota), Mike Remmers (Carolina to Minnesota),  Ricky Wagner (Baltimore to Detroit), Larry Warford (Detroit to New Orleans), Andrew Whitworth (Cincinnati to Los Angeles Rams), and Kevin Zeitler (Cincinnati to Cleveland).
Defensive linemen Calais Campbell (Arizona to Jacksonville) and Johnathan Hankins (New York Giants to Indianapolis)
Linebackers Jabaal Sheard (New England to Indianapolis), Malcolm Smith (Oakland to San Francisco), and Manti Te'o (Los Angeles Chargers to New Orleans)
Defensive backs A. J. Bouye (Houston to Jacksonville), Barry Church (Dallas to Jacksonville), Johnathan Cyprien (Jacksonville to Tennessee), Stephon Gilmore (Buffalo to New England), Micah Hyde (Green Bay to Buffalo), Tony Jefferson (Arizona to Baltimore), and Logan Ryan (New England to Tennessee),

Trades
The following notable trades were made during the 2017 league year:

March 9: Jacksonville traded TE Julius Thomas to Miami in exchange for a 2017 seventh-round pick.
March 9: Miami traded T Branden Albert to Jacksonville in exchange for a 2018 seventh-round pick.
March 9: Houston traded QB Brock Osweiler, a 2018 second-round pick, and a 2017 sixth-round pick to Cleveland in exchange for a 2017 fourth-round pick.
March 9: Indianapolis traded TE Dwayne Allen and a 2017 sixth-round pick to  New England in exchange for a 2017 fourth-round pick.
March 10: New Orleans traded WR Brandin Cooks and a 2017 fourth-round pick to New England in exchange for 2017 first and third-round picks.
March 10: Carolina traded DE Kony Ealy and 2017 a third-round pick to New England in exchange for a 2017 second-round pick.
March 15: Baltimore traded C Jeremy Zuttah and a 2017 sixth-round pick to San Francisco for a 2017 sixth-round pick.
April 4: Baltimore traded DT Timmy Jernigan and a 2017 third-round draft pick to Philadelphia in exchange for a 2017 third-round draft pick.
April 26: Seattle traded the contract rights of previously retired RB Marshawn Lynch and a 2018 sixth-round pick to Oakland for a 2018 fifth-round pick.
August 11: Buffalo traded WR Sammy Watkins and a 2018 sixth-round draft pick to the Los Angeles Rams for CB E. J. Gaines and a 2018 second-round pick. That same day, the Bills traded cornerback Ronald Darby to the Philadelphia Eagles for wide receiver Jordan Matthews and a 2018 third-round draft pick.

Notable retirements

 OT Ryan Clady: Four-time Pro Bowler, three-time All-Pro (two first-team, one second-team), and Super Bowl 50 champion. Clady played for the Denver Broncos and New York Jets during his nine-year career.
 WR Andre Johnson: Seven-time Pro Bowler and four-time All-Pro (two first-team, two second-team).  Johnson played for the Houston Texans, Indianapolis Colts, and Tennessee Titans during his 14-year career.
 T Jake Long: Four-time Pro Bowler, two-time All-Pro (one first-team, one second-team), and first overall pick of the 2008 NFL Draft.  Long played for the Miami Dolphins, St. Louis Rams, Atlanta Falcons, and Minnesota Vikings during his nine-year career.
 LB Robert Mathis:  Five-time Pro Bowler, two-time All Pro (one first-team, one second-team), and Super Bowl XLI champion.  Played his entire 14-year career for the Indianapolis Colts.
 QB Tony Romo: Four-time Pro Bowler and one-time second-team All-Pro. Romo played his entire 14-year career with the Dallas Cowboys. Shortly after his retirement, Romo joined CBS as a lead NFL game analyst.
 WR Steve Smith Sr.: Five-time Pro Bowler and three-time All Pro (two first-team, one second-team).  Smith played for the Carolina Panthers and Baltimore Ravens during his 16-year career.
 QB Michael Vick: Four-time Pro Bowler, first overall pick of the 2001 NFL Draft, and 2010  Comeback Player of the Year. Played for the Atlanta Falcons, Philadelphia Eagles, New York Jets, and Pittsburgh Steelers during his 13-year career.
 LB DeMarcus Ware: Nine-time Pro Bowler, seven-time All-Pro (four first-team, three second-team), and Super Bowl 50 champion. Ware played for the Dallas Cowboys and Denver Broncos during his 12-year career.
 WR Roddy White:  Four-time Pro Bowler and one-time first-team All-Pro. White played for the Atlanta Falcons during his entire 11-year career.
 DT Vince Wilfork: Five-time Pro Bowler, four-time All-Pro (one first-team, three second-team), and two-time Super Bowl Champion (XXXIX and XLIX). Wilfork played for the New England Patriots and Houston Texans during his 13-year career.

Others

Draft

The 2017 NFL Draft was held on April 27–29 in Philadelphia.  The Cleveland Browns selected Myles Garrett with the first overall pick.

Officiating changes
Alberto Riveron replaced Dean Blandino as the league's Vice President of Officiating. Blandino would then be hired by Fox Sports as a rule analyst.

The following officials were hired:

 Brian Bolinger (Line Judge)
 Mark Butterworth (Replay Official)
 Mike Carr (Down Judge)
 Mike Chase (Replay Official)
 Ryan Dickson (Field Judge)
 John McGrath (moved from field to Replay Official)
 Jimmy Oldham (Replay Official)
 David Oliver (Line Judge)
 Mearl Robinson (Field Judge)
 Brad Rogers (Field Judge)
 Danny Short (Line Judge)
 Steve Woods (Umpire)

Rule changes
The following rule changes were approved for the 2017 NFL season at the owners' meeting on March 28, 2017:
 Defensive players are now prohibited from running toward the line of scrimmage and leaping or hurdling over offensive linemen on field goal or PAT attempts, similar to a change made in college football for the 2017 season.  Previously this action was permitted as long as the leaper or hurdler did not land on other players.
 Include in the definition of a "defenseless player" receivers tracking the quarterback or looking back for the ball, including inside the legal contact (5 yards from the line of scrimmage) zone.
 Egregious hits to the head (similar to the "targeting" rule in NCAA football) will cause the player to risk immediate disqualification.
 The replay control center will make the final ruling on reviewed plays instead of the game referee, although the referee can still provide input on reviewable plays.
 The sideline replay monitor (the "hood") will be eliminated and replaced with a tablet on the field for the referee to review with the replay control center.
 Crackback blocks are now prohibited by a backfield player in motion, even if he is not more than two yards outside the tackle box when the ball is snapped.
 Make permanent the rule that players who commit two certain types of unsportsmanlike conduct penalties (throwing punches/forearms/kicking, even if they do not connect, directing abusive, threatening, or insulting language toward opponents, teammates, game officials or league officials, and using baiting or taunting acts or words that may engender ill will between teams) in the same game risk automatic disqualification.
 Extend for a second season the change in the touchback spot after a kickoff or safety free kick to the 25-yard line.
 Make illegal actions that would conserve time penalized by the option for a 10-second runoff inside of the two-minute warning of each half or overtime (previously this only applied in the final minute of each half or overtime).
 If a team commits multiple fouls on the same down with the intent of manipulating the game clock, the team will be penalized 15 yards for unsportsmanlike conduct and the game clock will be reset. This change was made in response to both the San Francisco 49ers and the Baltimore Ravens employing this strategy by intentionally holding the defensive players to allow the game clock to run down or run out (in the case of the Ravens' game vs. the Cincinnati Bengals) during the previous season. A team may NOT be disqualified if it is their second unsportsmanlike conduct penalty against them.
 In response to the move of Sarah Thomas from line judge to head linesman for the 2017 season, the NFL renamed the officiating position of the head linesman to "down judge".

The following rule changes were approved for the 2017 NFL season at the NFL Spring League meeting on May 23, 2017:
 Overtime has been shortened from 15 minutes to 10 minutes for preseason and regular season games. Playoff games will continue to have 15 minutes for overtime periods.
 Restrictions on celebrations have been relaxed, removing penalties for group celebrations, going to the ground to celebrate, or using the ball as a prop.
 Teams can bring two players back from injured reserve instead of one.
 Teams can now cut their preseason rosters from 90 players to 53 on one day, removing the deadline to get the roster down to 75 players before the final preseason game.
 Teams will not be required to give candidates for general manager final say over the 53-man roster.

The ban on teams contacting potential coaching candidates until that candidate's team has been eliminated from the playoffs was tabled.

2017 deaths
The following people associated with the NFL (or AFL) died in 2017.

Members of the Pro Football Hall of Fame

Cortez Kennedy Kennedy, a defensive tackle who spent 11 years with the Seattle Seahawks from 1990 to 2000 and had his number 96 retired by the organization, was a member of the Hall of Fame's class of 2012. He died May 23 at the age of 48, from suspected cardiac problems.
Yale Lary The special teams standout and defensive back played 11 nonconsecutive seasons for the Detroit Lions from 1952 to 1964, winning three championships, and was a member of the Hall's class of 1979. He died May 11 at the age of 86.
Dan Rooney was chairman and plurality owner of the Pittsburgh Steelers and one of the sons of founding owner Art Rooney, Sr. Having been officially involved with the franchise since 1960, Rooney was a part of all six of the Steelers' Super Bowl victories. In addition to this, Rooney was considered an active and progressive owner in the league's operations, most famously by successfully pushing for the Rooney Rule, an affirmative action policy requiring all NFL franchises to interview persons of color for head coaching vacancies. Concurrently with his role with the Steelers, Rooney also served as United States Ambassador to Ireland from 2009 to 2014. He was inducted into the Pro Football Hall of Fame in 2000, making him and his father the second father-son duo in the Hall behind Tim and Wellington Mara (to whom the Rooneys are related by marriage). Rooney died on April 13 at the age of 84.
Y. A. Tittle Tittle, a quarterback, spent 16 seasons in professional football, two in the All-America Football Conference and 14 in the NFL. He played for the Baltimore (Green) Colts, San Francisco 49ers (as a member of the Million Dollar Backfield) and New York Giants throughout his career. He set several passing records during his time in the NFL and is credited for inventing the alley-oop.  He was never able to win a league championship despite three consecutive appearances in the game for the Giants, who retired his number 14. He was a member of the Hall's class of 1971. Tittle died October 8 at the age of 90 from complications due to dementia.

Others

 Dave Adolph
 Bill Anderson
 Pervis Atkins
 Ron Billingsley
 Dave Brazil
 Kevin Cadle
 Bernie Casey
 Bill Cox
 Dick Enberg
 Bill Fischer
 Terry Glenn
 Tom Graham
 Larry Grantham
 Ralph Guglielmi
 James Hadnot
 James Hardy III
 Larry Hayes
 Mitchell Henry
 Aaron Hernandez
 Larry Hickman
 John Hilton
 Claude Hipps
 Michael Jackson
 Edwin Jackson
 Derrick Jensen
 Ken Kranz
 Bob Lee
 Tony Liscio
 Eddie Macon
 George Maderos
 Mickey Marvin
 Clay Matthews Sr.
 Ron Meyer
 Red Miller
 Paul Mitchell
 David Modell
 Tom Modrak
 Rod Monroe
 Quentin Moses
 Leonard Myers
 Tommy Neck
 Tommy Nobis
 Babe Parilli
 Benny Perrin
 Hugh Pitts
 Sonny Randle
 Len Rohde
 Max Runager
 Daniel Te'o-Nesheim
 John Thierry
 Jimmy Thomas
 Ted Topor
 Rick Tuten
 Wayne Walker
 Clarence Williams
 Ellery Williams

Preseason
Training camps for the 2017 season were held in late July through August. Teams started training camp no earlier than 15 days before the team's first scheduled preseason game.

Prior to the start of the regular season, each team played four preseason exhibition games, beginning on August 10. The preseason began on August 3, with the 2017 Pro Football Hall of Fame Game between the Dallas Cowboys (represented in the 2017 Hall of Fame Class by owner Jerry Jones) and the Arizona Cardinals (represented by quarterback Kurt Warner). It was televised nationally on NBC. The preseason schedule ended on August 31;  One preseason game between the Dallas Cowboys and Houston Texans, was canceled in the aftermath of Hurricane Harvey.

Regular season
The 2017 regular season's 256 games were played over a 17-week schedule which began on September 7. Each of the league's 32 teams plays a 16-game schedule, with one bye week for each team. The slate also features games on Monday nights. There are games played on Thursday, including the National Football League Kickoff game in prime time on September 7 and games on Thanksgiving Day. The regular season concluded with a full slate of 16 games on Sunday, December 31, all of which were the intra–division matchups, as it has been since .

Scheduling formula
Under the NFL's current scheduling formula, each team plays the other three teams in its own division twice. In addition a team plays against all four teams in one other division from each conference. The final two games on a team's schedule are against the two teams in the team's own conference in the divisions the team was not set to play which finished the previous season in the same rank in their division (e.g. the team which finished first in its division the previous season would play each other team in its conference that also finished first in its respective division). The preset division pairings for 2017 will be as follows.

Highlights of the 2017 schedule included:
 NFL Kickoff Game: The season started on September 7, featuring Kansas City at defending Super Bowl LI champion New England, with Kansas City winning.
 NFL International Series: The International Series underwent a split in branding, with each country's games receiving their own brand.
 NFL London Games: Four games were played in London: Baltimore at Jacksonville at Wembley Stadium on September 24, New Orleans at Miami at the same venue on October 1, Arizona at the Los Angeles Rams at Twickenham Stadium on October 22, and Minnesota at Cleveland at the same venue on October 29.  Jacksonville, New Orleans, Los Angeles, and Minnesota won these games.
 NFL Mexico Game: One game was played at Estadio Azteca in Mexico City: New England at Oakland on November 19.  New England won this game.  This marked the second consecutive year in which the Raiders have hosted a game in Mexico City.
 Thanksgiving Day: As has been the case since , three games were played on November 23: Minnesota at Detroit and the Los Angeles Chargers at Dallas in the traditional afternoon doubleheader, and the New York Giants at Washington in the nightcap.  Minnesota, Los Angeles, and Washington won these games.
 Christmas games: Christmas Day, December 25, fell on a Monday. Sunday Night Football moved from December 24, Christmas Eve, to Saturday, December 23, with  Minnesota at Green Bay.  The Sunday afternoon games were played as normal on Christmas Eve. A doubleheader was played on Christmas Day, with a late-afternoon game featuring Pittsburgh at Houston and Oakland at Philadelphia in the normal Monday Night Football game.  Minnesota, Pittsburgh, and Philadelphia won these contests.

The entire schedule was released on April 20, 2017.

In-season scheduling changes
The following games were moved or canceled because of severe weather, by way of flexible scheduling, or for other reasons:

 Preseason Week 4: Due to the effects of Hurricane Harvey in the Houston area, the Dallas–Houston game was eventually canceled. The 2017 Texas Governor's Cup preseason game, originally scheduled to be played at Houston's NRG Stadium, was initially moved to the Cowboys' AT&T Stadium, before the NFL opted instead to cancel the game altogether in order to allow Texans' players and coaches to reunite with their families and assist with the relief efforts.
 Week 1: Due to the threat posed from Hurricane Irma, the Tampa Bay–Miami game was rescheduled to Week 11 (November 19), when both teams were originally scheduled to have their bye week.  Both teams therefore had their bye rescheduled to Week 1. This is the first time a hurricane forced a postponement of an NFL game since  when Baltimore and Houston had their game postponed due to Hurricane Ike.
 Week 7: The Cincinnati–Pittsburgh game, originally scheduled to start at 1:00 p.m. ET, was moved to 4:25 p.m. ET, still on CBS.  In addition, the Carolina–Chicago game was cross-flexed from Fox to CBS, still at 1:00 p.m. ET.
 Week 12: The New Orleans–Los Angeles Rams game, originally scheduled to start at 4:05 p.m. ET on Fox, was cross-flexed and moved to 4:25 p.m. ET on CBS. In addition, the Tennessee–Indianapolis game was cross-flexed from CBS to Fox, still at 1:00 p.m. ET.
 Week 13: The Carolina–New Orleans game, originally scheduled to start at 1:00 p.m. ET, was moved to 4:25 p.m. ET, still on Fox. In addition, the Denver–Miami game was cross-flexed from CBS to Fox, still at 1:00 p.m. ET.
 Week 14: The Dallas–New York Giants game, originally scheduled to start at 4:25 p.m. ET, was moved to 1:00 p.m. ET, still on Fox.  In addition, the Seattle–Jacksonville game, originally scheduled to start at 1:00 p.m. ET, was moved to 4:25 p.m. ET, still on Fox.
 Week 15: The Houston–Jacksonville game was cross-flexed from CBS to Fox, still at 1:00 p.m. ET.
 Week 17: All games with playoff implications were moved to a 4:25 p.m. ET kickoff, with no change in network assignment: Cincinnati–Baltimore, Buffalo–Miami, Jacksonville–Tennessee, Carolina–Atlanta, and New Orleans–Tampa Bay. Additionally, no Sunday Night Football game was scheduled, marking the first time since  that the regular season play concluded with no primetime game. The NFL stated that it did not want to schedule a primetime game that could potentially lose its playoff implications due to the events of the afternoon games, as well as conflicting with New Year's Eve programming.

Regular season standings

Division

Conference

Postseason

The 2017 playoffs began on January 6–7, 2018 with the Wild Card playoff round. The four winners of these playoff games visited the top two seeded teams in each conference in the Divisional round games played on January 13–14. The winners of those games advanced the Conference championship games was held on January 21. The two Conference champions advanced to Super Bowl LII was held on February 4 at U.S. Bank Stadium in Minneapolis. The 2018 Pro Bowl was held at Camping World Stadium in Orlando on January 28.

Bracket

Notable events

Protesting police brutality

During a September 22, 2017 speech, the President of the United States, Donald Trump, made controversial remarks criticizing the practice of taking a knee during the playing of the national anthem—a practice popularized by Colin Kaepernick in 2016 as part of an effort to protest alleged racial inequality and police brutality. Trump suggested that those who partake in the practice were disrespecting the country's heritage, and asked his audience, "wouldn't you love to see one of these NFL owners, when somebody disrespects our flag, to say, 'Get that son of a bitch off the field right now. Out! He's fired. He's fired!'" During the subsequent weekend of games, over 200 players protested the remarks, by either kneeling or locking arms during the playing of the national anthem. The Pittsburgh Steelers (with the exception of offensive tackle and former Army Ranger Alejandro Villanueva), Tennessee Titans and Seattle Seahawks chose to not go out on field at all during the anthem.

Sale of the Carolina Panthers
On December 17, 2017, Jerry Richardson, owner of the Carolina Panthers, announced he was putting the team up for sale. Richardson had previously indicated the team would be put up for sale after his death (since his only living son left the team in 2009), but an exposé in Sports Illustrated accused Richardson of paying hush money to cover up questionable conduct, including racial slurs and sexually suggestive requests of employees, hastening Richardson's decision. The Panthers' lease on Bank of America Stadium expired after the 2018 season, which would have allowed any incoming owner to relocate the team out of the Carolinas to another market of their choice without penalty had they so desired.

Records, milestones, and notable statistics

Week 1
Kareem Hunt finished with 246 total yards, setting the record for the most total yards (rushing and receiving) in an NFL debut.

Week 2
Antonio Gates scored his 112th career receiving touchdown, breaking the NFL record for most receiving touchdowns by a tight end.  The previous record of 111 was held by Tony Gonzalez.
Aaron Rodgers passed for his 300th touchdown, surpassing Peyton Manning as the fastest quarterback to reach that milestone both in attempts and appearances.

Week 3
Odell Beckham Jr. broke the record for fastest receiver to reach 300 career receptions, doing so in 45 games.
Matt Prater broke the previous NFL record of three made field goals from more than 55 yards in a season by kicking a 57-yard field goal against the Atlanta Falcons.
Jake Elliott kicked a 61-yard field goal, the longest for a rookie in NFL history.

Week 5
 Larry Fitzgerald became the third player in NFL history to record 200 straight games with a reception, joining Jerry Rice and Tony Gonzalez.

Week 6
Tom Brady recorded his 187th career regular season win as a starting quarterback, setting an NFL record. The previous record of 186 wins was shared by Peyton Manning and Brett Favre.

Week 7
 Drew Brees became the third player in NFL history to record 500 or more career passing touchdowns (including playoffs), joining Brett Favre, and Peyton Manning.
Eddie Jackson became the first player in NFL history with multiple defensive touchdowns of at least 75 yards in the same game.

Week 9
Matt Ryan passed for 39,858 career yards after 150 career games, breaking the record for most passing yards by a player in NFL history in his first 150 games previously held by Drew Brees.
Eli Manning became the seventh quarterback in NFL history with at least 50,000 passing yards.

Week 10
Larry Fitzgerald became the sixth player in NFL history to record 15,000 career receiving yards. He's the second-youngest player in NFL history to do it, behind Jerry Rice.
Matt Ryan reached 40,000 career passing yards in 151 games, the fewest games in NFL history, surpassing the previous record held by Drew Brees (152 games).

Week 11
Larry Fitzgerald passed Tony Gonzalez into fifth place all-time in receiving yards.

Week 12
Julio Jones had 563 catches for 8,649 yards in 90 career games, the most by a player in his first 90 games in NFL history. He passed Anquan Boldin (558) for the most receptions and Lance Alworth (8,502) for the most receiving yards.
Russell Wilson became the quarterback with most wins in a player's first six seasons with 63 wins, surpassing Joe Flacco.
Eli Manning became the eighth quarterback to lose 100 starts and the first to do so with one team.

Week 13
By defeating the Buffalo Bills, Tom Brady broke the record for most wins by a quarterback against one team, with 27.  The record was previously held by Brett Favre, who had defeated the Detroit Lions 26 times.
Larry Fitzgerald moved into fourth place all-time in receiving yards, passing Isaac Bruce.  
Larry Fitzgerald surpassed 1,200 career receptions, becoming the third player in NFL history to reach this mark (joining Jerry Rice and Tony Gonzalez) and the fastest player to reach this milestone in 214 games (breaking Rice's record of 221 games).
Russell Wilson tied Eli Manning in 2011 for the most fourth quarter touchdowns in a single season with 15.
Frank Gore moved past Jerome Bettis and LaDainian Tomlinson for fifth place all-time in rushing yards.

Week 14
Larry Fitzgerald moved into third place all-time in receiving yards, passing Randy Moss.
Ben Roethlisberger became the first quarterback in NFL history to throw for at least 500 yards in three different games.
He also set the record for most completions in a regulation game, with 44.
Week 15
LeSean McCoy surpassed 10,000 career rushing yards, becoming the 30th player in league history to reach the milestone.

Week 16
The New England Patriots have won at least 12 games in eight consecutive seasons, surpassing the 2003–09 Indianapolis Colts for the longest such streak in NFL history.
Drew Brees became the third quarterback to throw for 70,000 yards, joining Peyton Manning and Brett Favre.  Brees reached the milestone in his 248th career game and is the fastest in league history to accomplish the feat.  
Drew Brees surpassed the 4,000 passing yards for the 12th consecutive season, extending his own record.

Week 17
The Cleveland Browns joined the 2008 Detroit Lions as the only teams since the implementation of the 16-game season to lose every game in a season.
The Buffalo Bills ended the NFL's longest active playoff drought at 17 seasons, making their first playoff appearance since 1999.
Frank Gore surpassed 14,000 career rushing yards, becoming the fifth player in NFL history to do so, after Emmitt Smith, Walter Payton, Barry Sanders, and Curtis Martin.

Postseason

Wild Card Round
The Tennessee Titans became the third away team in NFL history to have rallied from at least 18 points down to win a playoff game, joining the 1957 Detroit Lions and the 1972 Dallas Cowboys
Marcus Mariota attempted a pass, which was deflected by Darrelle Revis, back into the hands of Mariota who promptly ran it in for a touchdown, making him the first quarterback in NFL postseason history to complete a touchdown pass to himself. This also made him the first player in the Super Bowl era with passing and receiving touchdowns in the same playoff game.

Super Bowl LII
Super Bowl LII marked an NFL record eighth Super Bowl appearance for Tom Brady and Bill Belichick a QB/head coach duo.
It also marked the New England Patriots' 10th Super Bowl appearance, extending their own record.
Tom Brady's career 357 pass attempts, 235 completions, 2,576 passing yards, and 18 passing touchdowns in the Super Bowl are all records. 
Tom Brady set the single-game record for most passing yards in a Super Bowl with 505. 
The 33 points scored by the Patriots were the most points scored by the losing team in a Super Bowl.
The Patriots set Super Bowl records for most total yards in a game with 613, the fewest punts in a game with zero, and the most passing yards with 505.
Jake Elliott set the Super Bowl rookie record by kicking a 46-yard field goal.
The Patriots and the Philadelphia Eagles combined for several Super Bowl records including, 42 first downs passing, 1,151 total yards, 874 passing yards, fewest punts in the game with one, and four missed PAT conversions.  The 1,151 total yards set a record for the most combined yards in any NFL game (regular or post-season)

Regular season statistical leaders

Awards

Individual season awards

The 7th Annual NFL Honors, saluting the best players and plays from 2017 season, was held at the Northrop Auditorium in Minneapolis, Minnesota on February 3, 2018.

All-Pro team

The following players were named First Team All-Pro by the Associated Press:

Players of the week/month
The following were named the top performers during the 2017 season:

Head coaching and front office personnel changes

Head coaches

Offseason

In-season

Front office personnel

Offseason

In-season

Stadiums

Atlanta Falcons
The Atlanta Falcons played their first season at Mercedes-Benz Stadium, after playing in the Georgia Dome for the previous 25 seasons. The Georgia Dome was demolished by implosion on the morning of November 20, 2017.

Relocations

San Diego Chargers' relocation to Los Angeles
On January 12, 2017, the San Diego Chargers exercised their option to relocate to Los Angeles as the Los Angeles Chargers. They joined the Los Angeles Rams as tenants in their new stadium, SoFi Stadium in Inglewood, California when that stadium opened in 2020. Between 2017 and 2019, the Chargers played at the 30,000 seat StubHub Center in Carson, California, the smallest venue (in terms of number of seats) the league has used for a full season since 1956.

Oakland Raiders' relocation to Las Vegas

On January 19, 2017, the Oakland Raiders filed paperwork to relocate to Las Vegas, Nevada. The NFL officially approved the Raiders relocation to Las Vegas on March 27. Unlike the Chargers, the Raiders remained at the Oakland–Alameda County Coliseum through the 2018 and 2019 seasons while Allegiant Stadium was built, with the team moving to Nevada in 2020.

Attendance
The Los Angeles Rams, who had capped season ticket sales at 55,000 for the 2017 season, announced to have 60,128 spectators in the first home game on week 1. However, reports estimate that spectators only filled a third of the 93,607 seats of the Los Angeles Memorial Coliseum. The Los Angeles Chargers did not sell out their week 2 game at the StubHub Center, which was never expanded to 30,000 seats as originally stated and has typically had less than 26,000 fans in attendance. When the StubHub Center was at capacity, the majority of the fans present were supporters of the opposing team. Among the most notable examples was the October 1 game against Philadelphia Eagles being a mainly pro-Philadelphia crowd.

The San Francisco 49ers reported a Week 3 attendance total that exceeded the capacity of Levi's Stadium, even as wide swaths of empty seats were seen throughout the game. This followed similar sparse attendance for the 49ers' home opener. Even the Dallas Cowboys, a team whose fan base is among the largest in the United States, played their week 13 Thursday Night Football game in front of a half-empty AT&T Stadium. The lifting of the league's blackout policy was cited as one factor in the decline in ticket sales, as viewers would rather watch from the comfort of their homes, especially when weather conditions were less than ideal. At a Colts-Bills game held in blinding lake-effect snow on December 10, scalpers said they had not sold any tickets, an extreme rarity. A majority of television sets in all Western New York were tuned into some portion of the game, the highest viewership for a non-Super Bowl NFL game in the region since record-keeping began.

New uniforms and patches
Twenty-five teams transitioned to Nike's new uniform template. While most teams have just transitioned to it without any actual changes to the uniforms themselves, the New Orleans Saints, Cincinnati Bengals, and Los Angeles Rams uniforms are the most noticeable in it, fixing their collars in the process.
The Detroit Lions unveiled new uniforms on April 13, 2017, eliminating all black elements from the uniform and logo for the first time since 2002. They added a new alternate uniform as well as a new Color Rush uniform.
The Los Angeles Rams announced they would be switching their primary helmets to white and blue, similar to their Color Rush helmets. The team had fans vote on the color of their facemask, which would be white, and the design of their pants, which would be white with a blue stripe. The Rams also announced that they would explore a full rebrand in the near future.
The Cincinnati Bengals will wear a patch to commemorate their 50th season.
The San Francisco 49ers have altered their sleeve striping from 3 stripes to 2 stripes.
 The Seattle Seahawks dedicated their season to former Seahawks defensive tackle Cortez Kennedy, who died on May 23, 2017, by wearing a No. 96 decal on their helmets.
The Pittsburgh Steelers will wear a patch to honor their former chairman, the late Dan Rooney, who died in April, at the age of 84. The patch will feature a shamrock, with Rooney's initials "DMR". The last time the Steelers wore a jersey patch was when Art Rooney died in 1988. They also donned a helmet decal to honor Chuck Noll, who died in 2014.
 The Dallas Cowboys will wear blue jerseys at home on a more regular basis, marking the first time the team has worn blue jerseys at home outside of Thanksgiving games since the NFL allowed teams to wear white jerseys at home in 1964. Despite the team's well-documented blue jersey "jinx", player preference as well as stronger retail sales of the navy blue jerseys over the white ones have prompted the team's decision. The blue jerseys will be worn for "high-profile" games at AT&T Stadium.
 The New York Giants wore a No. 14 decal on their helmets to honor Y. A. Tittle, who died on October 8, 2017. Later, they would wear a "JHT" patch from Week 10 onwards, in honor of Joan Tisch, the mother of Giants co-owner Steve Tisch, who died on November 2, 2017.
The Buffalo Bills wore their all-red Color Rush uniforms when they faced the Indianapolis Colts in the aforementioned December 10 "snow game", the first team to do so on a Sunday, and the fourth team overall.
 All current and former Walter Payton NFL Man of the Year Award winners will wear a patch on their jerseys in perpetuity to acknowledge to recognize their outstanding contributions to the game and to their communities. Similarly, current nominees will wear a decal on their helmets for the rest of the season.
The Atlanta Falcons wore their all red color rush jerseys with black numbers against the Saints on December 7, 2017. The numbers were a classic form of numbers. The alternate has the regular Falcon unlike the other alternate. The regular Atlanta Falcons' alternate is a black jersey, with a black helmet, and on the black helmet is the original Falcons logo.

Media

Broadcast rights

Television 
This was the fourth season under the league's broadcast contracts with its television partners. ESPN continued to air Monday Night Football, while  ESPN2 simulcast ESPN Deportes' Spanish-language Monday Night Football broadcasts for the first nine weeks of the regular season; this served as filler programming for the channel until the start of its Monday-night college basketball broadcasts. Along with ESPN's Wild Card game on ABC, ESPN also simulcast the 2018 Pro Bowl on ABC, marking the return of the Pro Bowl to ABC for the first time since 2003.

The practice of "cross-flexing" (switching) Sunday afternoon games continued between CBS and Fox before or during the season, regardless of whether the visiting team is in the AFC (which CBS normally airs) or the NFC (which is normally carried by Fox). NBC continued to air Sunday Night Football, the annual Kickoff game, and the primetime Thanksgiving game, and broadcast Super Bowl LII. This also was the second and final year of the current Thursday Night Football contract with CBS, NBC, and NFL Network. 

Although never explicitly announced, the league continued the moratorium on its blackout policy, ensuring all games would be televised in the market of their home teams regardless of ticket sales.

Because of fog and smoke obstruction, NBC was forced to televise large portions of two of their Sunday Night Football games from the skycam angle. Positive reception led NBC to experiment with increased usage of the angle as a primary view during its November 16 and December 14 Thursday Night Football telecasts. Because the angle distorts distance, the traditional sideline camera angle was used for close-yardage situations such as the red zone.

Digital 
In over-the-top rights, Amazon Video acquired non-exclusive streaming rights to the 10 broadcast television Thursday Night Football games for $50 million. These streams are exclusive to paid Amazon Prime subscribers, in contrast to Twitter, which held the rights to the same package in 2016 and had made those streams free to most of the world.

Verizon Communications acquired international streaming rights to an NFL London Game between the Baltimore Ravens and Jacksonville Jaguars, in a similar arrangement to the 2015 game that was streamed by Yahoo!—which was acquired by Verizon in 2017. The game was streamed by Yahoo and other Verizon-owned platforms, including AOL, go90, and Complex. NFL Network remains a partner with Twitter for online content, including its new streaming news program NFL Blitz Live. The NFL also reached a deal with Facebook in September 2017 to offer video highlights following games, and streaming programs on the service's new Watch platform.

This was the final season of the NFL's exclusive mobile streaming contract with Verizon Wireless; the league intended to no longer have a single exclusive partner going forward, citing changes to viewing habits. On December 11, 2017, the NFL announced that it had agreed to a new 5-year, $2.5 billion digital rights agreement with Verizon, allowing it to stream in-market Sunday afternoon games, as well as all nationally televised games, across its mobile platforms. Unlike the previous deal, these streams are no longer exclusive to Verizon Wireless subscribers, as Verizon planned to leverage the divisions of its digital media subsidiary Oath (including the aforementioned Yahoo) as a platform to promote these streams to a larger audience, as well as other digital content and expanded highlights rights. As part of the agreement, Verizon began allowing access to its existing mobile streams to non-customers for the 2017-18 playoffs. As the new contract is non-exclusive, the NFL's television partners may negotiate to add the mobile streaming rights that were reserved to Verizon under the previous contract; NBC was the first to do so.

Two new international digital rights deals led to user criticism over their quality of service. In Canada, NFL Sunday Ticket shifted from distribution through television providers to the over-the-top provider DAZN, while in Europe, Deltatre took over European distribution of NFL Game Pass and launched new mobile apps. Both services faced criticism over their streaming quality, while Delatre's app faced criticism for having bugs and initially lacking features seen in the previous version of the platform. The Independent exposed that Deltatre had also issued an internal e-mail instructing its employees to give the apps 5-star reviews. DAZN subsequently announced that it would return to distributing Sunday Ticket through Canadian television providers in addition to their OTT service.

Radio 
This was the final season of the NFL's existing national radio contract with Westwood One. Entravision (in the last year of a three-year deal) and ESPN Deportes Radio split Spanish broadcast rights.

Commercials
The league has sought to reduce the number of standard commercial breaks (media timeouts) on its telecasts from 21 to 16, four in each quarter, with each break extended by one additional 30-second commercial. One particular scenario the league sought to eliminate is the "double-up," in which a network cuts to a commercial after a scoring play, then airs the kickoff, and again goes to commercial before play from scrimmage resumes. Under the proposal, the league will allow networks to cut to commercial during instant replay reviews, which it had not been allowed to do before. Commissioner Roger Goodell stated that the changes are being made in an attempt to consolidate downtime between the actual game play so that there are fewer and less noticeable interruptions; he does not expect the changes to have an appreciable impact on the real-time length of a game, which currently clocks in at slightly over three hours.

The NFL has also, as a trial, lifted its ban on the broadcast of commercials for distilled spirits during its telecasts. However, they are subject to restrictions; a maximum of four liquor ads may be broadcast per-game, along with two per-pregame and postgame show. These ads may not contain football-related themes or target underage viewers, and must contain a "prominent social responsibility message".

Personnel changes
Tony Romo, who announced his retirement as a player on April 4, 2017, joined CBS, where he replaced Phil Simms as lead color commentator. Simms and Nate Burleson, who comes over from NFL Network, will replace Tony Gonzalez and Bart Scott on CBS's pregame show, The NFL Today. Jay Cutler also announced his retirement from professional football on May 5 and was slated to join Fox as a color analyst for its NFL coverage; he later rescinded that announcement in August and joined the Miami Dolphins. Gonzalez will move to Fox, where he will join Fox NFL Kickoff; upon his departure, Gonzalez stated that he wished to pursue opportunities closer to his home in California, rather than travel to New York weekly to appear on CBS. James Lofton, coming over from radio, will replace Solomon Wilcots as a CBS analyst.

On May 31, 2017, it was announced that Mike Tirico would replace Al Michaels on play-by-play on NBC's portion of the Thursday Night Football package, joined by Cris Collinsworth. The NFL had previously required this role to be filled by NBC's lead broadcast team of Michaels and Collinsworth; Tirico called a limited slate of games in 2016, including several NBC-broadcast games as a fill-in for Michaels (who voluntarily took several games off due to the increased number he was calling that season), and as part of a secondary team for selected games the TNF package. He will also succeed Bob Costas as the lead studio host for NBC. However, due to its proximity to the 2018 Winter Olympics (where he also succeeded Bob Costas as lead host), Tirico did not participate in NBC's Super Bowl LII coverage.

Beth Mowins became the second woman to call play-by-play for a national NFL broadcast, following Gayle Sierens in 1987, when she served as play-by-play announcer for the nightcap in ESPN's Week 1 Monday Night doubleheader, with Rex Ryan as her color commentator. In an unusual case of a broadcaster working for two networks in the same season, Mowins also called a regional game for CBS in Weeks 3, 15 and 17, with Jay Feely as her partner.

Also, this would end up being the last season for the Monday Night Football broadcast team of Sean McDonough, Jon Gruden, and Lisa Salters. Gruden would return to coaching the next year for the Oakland Raiders, while McDonough would return to doing College Football for ESPN, although Salters will still be on MNF. McDonough will be replaced by Joe Tessitore, who has done work for ESPN as a College Football announcer, like McDonough, while Jason Witten, who would end up retiring after this season, will replace Gruden, with Booger McFarland, being added as a field analyst.

Most watched regular season games
DH = doubleheader; SNF = NBC Sunday Night Football

*Note – Late DH matchups listed in table are the matchups that were shown to the largest percentage of the market.

References

 
National Football League seasons